Bianca is a 1913 silent American short film, written by Hanson Durham, and directed by Robert Thornby.

Cast
 George Cooper
 George Kunkel
 Patricia Palmer

External links

1913 films
American black-and-white films
American silent short films
Films directed by Robert Thornby
1910s American films